The Furniture, Timber and Allied Trades Union (FTAT) was a trade union in the United Kingdom.

History
The union was founded in 1971 by the merger of the National Union of Furniture Trade Operatives (NUFTO) and the Amalgamated Society of Woodcutting Machinists.  In 1978, the National Union of Funeral Service Operatives merged with it, while the National Society of Brushmakers and General Workers joined in 1983.  The following year, its total membership was 85,407.  The union was a member of the Confederation of Shipbuilding and Engineering Unions.

Initially, the union had six trade groups, reduced to five in the 1980s: upholstery, soft furnishing and bedding, woodcutting machinists, funeral services, flat glass and processing, and supervisory and clerical.

The union was known for its left-wing outlook, inherited from NUFTO.  In the 1981 Labour Party deputy leadership election, it supported Tony Benn.  Some of FTAT's Silentnight members, based in Barnoldswick, were involved in Britain's longest ever strike, from 1985 until 1987.

By 1993, membership was down to 31,642, and the union merged with the GMB, forming the bulk of its new "Construction, Furniture, Timber and Allied" section.

Election results
The union sponsored Labour Party candidates in several Parliamentary elections.

General Secretaries
1971: Alf Tomkins
1975: Robert Shube
1978: Ben Rubner
1986: Colin Christopher

References

External links
Catalogue of the FTAT archives, held at the Modern Records Centre, University of Warwick

 
Defunct trade unions of the United Kingdom
Trade unions established in 1971
Trade unions disestablished in 1993
1971 establishments in the United Kingdom
Furniture industry trade unions
GMB (trade union) amalgamations
Trade unions based in London